The 1998–99 Iran 2nd Division football season was played in four groups of nine teams each.

First round

Group 1

Group 2

Group 3

Group 4

Second round

Group 1

Group 2

Play Off

Irsotter  Noshahr promoted to 1999–2000 Azadegan League

Bahman promoted to 1999–2000 Azadegan League.

Final

(Irsotter  Noshahr did not show up, Bahman awarded championship 1998/99)

References 

www.rsssf.com

League 2 (Iran) seasons
Iran
2